The Progressive Alliance (PA) is a political international of progressive and social democratic political parties and organisations founded on 22 May 2013 in Leipzig, Germany. The alliance was formed as an alternative to the existing Socialist International, of which many of its member parties are former or current members. The Progressive Alliance claims 140 participants from around the world.

History 
The first step towards the creation of the Progressive Alliance was the decision in January 2012 by Sigmar Gabriel, then chairman of the Social Democratic Party of Germany (SPD), to cancel payment of the SPD's £100,000 yearly membership fee to the Socialist International. Gabriel had been critical of the Socialist International's admittance and continuing inclusion of undemocratic political movements into the organisation.

An initial Conference of the Progressive Alliance was held in Rome, Italy, on 14–15 December 2012, with representatives of 42 political parties attending. They included Pier Luigi Bersani, leader of the Democratic Party of Italy; Harlem Désir, Chair of the French Socialist Party; Hermes Binner, Chair of the Argentine Socialist Party; Peter Shumlin, Democratic Governor of Vermont; and Mustapha Ben Jafar, Secretary General of the Tunisian Democratic Forum for Labour and Liberties. Also present were representatives of the Indian National Congress, the Workers' Party of Brazil, and PASOK of Greece. The Dutch Labour Party also supported the formation of the organisation, as did the Swiss Socialist Party, and the Social Democratic Party of Austria.

During the Council of the Socialist International in Cascais, Portugal, on 4–5 February 2013, 50 political parties discussed on the sidelines the formation of the Progressive Alliance, including the Movement for Democratic Change of Zimbabwe.

The official foundation of the organisation was held on 22 May 2013 in Leipzig, Germany, on the 150th anniversary of the formation of the General German Workers' Association (ADAV), the predecessor of the SPD. The organisation stated the aim of becoming the global network of "the progressive, democratic, social-democratic, socialist and labour movement". It was reported that representatives of approximately 70 social-democratic political parties from across the world attended the event. The Progressive Alliance of Socialists and Democrats (S&D) group in the European Parliament joined the organisation upon its official foundation. Many member parties are also affiliated to the Socialist International. In September 2013 the Democratic Party of Cyprus (DIKO) announced that it was negotiating to join the Progressive Alliance and that its representatives were to attend a seminar of the international in Stockholm on 24 October. The Democratic Party of Korea was a founding member but withdrew in 2016. The Korean Justice Party currently participates as an observer.

On 4–5 December 2014, a Progressive Alliance conference was held in Lisbon for member parties of the S&D group. A regional seminar was held on 25 September 2015 in Batu Ferringhi, Malaysia, which also hosted delegates from the Democratic Action Party of Malaysia, Democratic Party of Japan and Indonesian Democratic Party of Struggle. On 25 April 2016 the organisation held a seminar in São Paulo hosted by the Workers' Party of Brazil.

Participants 
The Progressive Alliance lists 118 parties and 28 organisations which participate in the network, rather than claiming members.

References

External links 

 

 
Organizations established in 2013
Left-wing internationals
Progressivism
Social democratic organizations
2013 establishments in Germany